Jeffrey Scott Richardson (born August 29, 1963) is an American former professional baseball pitcher. He batted and threw right-handed.

External links

1963 births
Living people
American expatriate baseball players in Canada
Baseball players from Kansas
California Angels players
Columbia Mets players
Edmonton Trappers players
Jackson Mets players
Little Falls Mets players
Lynchburg Mets players
Medicine Hat Blue Jays players
Midland Angels players
Palm Springs Angels players
Connors State Cowboys baseball players